Heschong is a surname. Notable people with the surname include:

Albert Heschong (1919–2001), American production designer 
Gregg Heschong, American cinematographer and television director
Lisa Heschong, American Architect, Author, and founding Principal of the Heschong Mahone Group (HMG)
Eric Heschong, American artist